Arthur Roe may refer to:

 Arthur Roe (politician) (1878–1942), American politician and lawyer
 Arthur Stanley Roe, medical doctor from Queensland, Australia
 Arthur Roe (footballer) (1892–1960), English football half back